Baron Ján Jesenský (30 December 1874 in Tučiansky Svätý Martin, Kingdom of Hungary (present day Martin, Slovakia) – 27 December 1945 in Bratislava, Czechoslovakia) was a Slovak lower nobleman of the House of Jeszenszky, poet, prose writer, translator, and politician. He was a prominent member of the Slovak national movement.

External links 
 Album of Slovak Writers – Janko Jesenský

1874 births
1945 deaths
Slovak poets
Slovak writers
Slovak translators
People from Martin, Slovakia
Recipients of the Order of Tomáš Garrigue Masaryk
Janko
Burials at National Cemetery in Martin
Slovak nobility
Austro-Hungarian poets